Rhyacionia buoliana, the pine shoot moth, is a moth of the family Tortricidae. It is native to North Africa, North Asia, and Europe, and invasive in North America and South America.

The wingspan is 16–24 mm. The forewings are ferruginous-orange, often partly suffused with dark red and with  several irregular variable anastomosing metallic grey-whitish striae and costal strigulae. The hindwings are light grey. The larva is brown-reddish; head and plate of 2 black.

Adults are on wing from June to August in western Europe.

The larvae feed on pine. The original host plants are Pinus sylvestris and Pinus nigra. The host-plant spectrum has been expanded to more members of the genus Pinus after the introduction of North American pine species into Europe and after transport of Rhyacionia buoliana to North and South America. This species is also recorded from Abies alba.

Subspecies
Rhyacionia buoliana
Rhyacionia buoliana thurificana (Lederer, 1855)

Parasites
The larvae are attacked by the tachinid fly Actia nudibasis.

References

External links

Pine Shoot Moth at UKMoths
Lepiforum.de

Eucosmini
Moths described in 1775
Moths of Africa
Moths of Asia
Tortricidae of Europe
Moths of North America
Tortricidae of South America
Taxa named by Michael Denis
Taxa named by Ignaz Schiffermüller